Nikita Prokhorov (born 10 January 1991) is a Russian athlete who competes in disability athletics in the F46 category. He won the gold medal for the shot put at the 2012 Paralympic Games for his category with a new World Record. At the 2013 World Championships Prokhorov broke his own World record in the shot put as he won gold in the F46 class. In the discus throw, Prokhorov set a new championship record when winning gold in the F46 class.

References

External links

 IPC Profile

1987 births
Living people
Medalists at the 2012 Summer Paralympics
Athletes (track and field) at the 2012 Summer Paralympics
Paralympic athletes of Russia
Paralympic gold medalists for Russia
Russian male discus throwers
Russian male javelin throwers
Paralympic medalists in athletics (track and field)
Athletes (track and field) at the 2020 Summer Paralympics
Paralympic silver medalists for the Russian Paralympic Committee athletes
Paralympic shot putters
Russian male shot putters
Paralympic discus throwers
Paralympic javelin throwers
21st-century Russian people